Kristal is both a given name and a surname. Notable people with the name include:

Given name:
 Kristal Marshall, American model, actress, beauty queen, and retired professional wrestler
 Kristal Uzelac, former gymnast
Kristal Abazaj, Albanian professional footballer
Kristal Tin, Hong Kong singer and former TVB actress

Surname:
 Hilly Kristal, club owner
 Marko Kristal (1973–), Estonian football manager and former player
 Yisrael Kristal (1903–2017), a Polish-Israeli supercentenarian and Holocaust survivor